The James Earl Jones Theatre, originally the Cort Theatre, is a Broadway theater at 138 West 48th Street, between Seventh Avenue and Sixth Avenue, in the Theater District of Midtown Manhattan in New York City, United States. It was built in 1912 and designed by architect Thomas W. Lamb for impresario John Cort. An annex to the west of the theater, built between 2021 and 2022, was designed by Kostow Greenwood Architects. The Jones has 1,092 seats across three levels and is operated by the Shubert Organization. Both the facade and interior of the theater are New York City designated landmarks.

The theater maintains much of its original neoclassical design. Its 48th Street facade has a glass-and-metal marquee shielding the entrances, as well as a colonnade with an additional story above. The lobby has marble paneling and a coved ceiling. The auditorium  contains a ground-level orchestra and two overhanging balconies with boxes. The auditorium's proscenium arch is designed with "art glass" that can illuminate during performances, and its ceiling is coved. The western annex contains lounges, restrooms, and backstage areas.

John Cort received the rights to operate the theater in January 1912, and the Cort Theatre opened on December 20, 1912. Despite being regarded by the theatrical community as being on the "wrong side" of Broadway, the Cort hosted numerous hit productions during its early years. The Shubert Organization purchased the theater in 1927, two years before Cort's death. Though the theater was used as a television studio for The Merv Griffin Show from 1969 to 1972, it has mostly remained in theatrical use through the years. The Cort closed temporarily in 2020 during the COVID-19 pandemic and was renovated during that time. In 2022, it was renamed after actor James Earl Jones, becoming the second Broadway venue named after a Black theatrical personality.

Site
The James Earl Jones Theatre is a Broadway theater on 138 West 48th Street, on the south sidewalk between Seventh Avenue and Sixth Avenue (near Times Square), in the Theater District of Midtown Manhattan in New York City. Nearby buildings include 1221 Avenue of the Americas to the northeast, 1211 Avenue of the Americas to the east, the Church of St. Mary the Virgin to the south, the Palace Theatre and TSX Broadway to the southwest, and 20 Times Square to the west.

Design
The James Earl Jones Theatre, designed by Thomas W. Lamb in the neoclassical style for impresario John Cort, was constructed in 1912. The venue is one of Lamb's few remaining theater buildings. Although Edward B. Corey was frequently credited as the architect, Lamb was the architect of record. and William Crawford was the general contractor for the project. An annex directly to the west was designed by Kostow Greenwood Architects and is being built between 2021 and 2022.

Facade

Original theater 

The main elevation of the Jones's facade faces north on 48th Street and is made of marble, with a layer of stone underlying it. The original two-story theater facade is split into a central pavilion with a colonnade of three bays; the central colonnade is flanked by one additional bay to either side. The facade was modeled on the Petit Trianon, an 18th-century neoclassical chateau at Versailles. A contemporary New-York Tribune article characterized the main facade elevation as being designed in the Louis XVI-era style.

The central pavilion contains four fluted engaged columns with Corinthian-style capitals. At ground level, each of the three center bays contains a set of double doors made of glass and aluminum, above which is a marquee. The original marquee had three Art Nouveau arches, but it was replaced in the 20th century with a boxy structure with signs on either side. A new marquee, similar in design to the original, was installed in 2021; it contains three arches framed by metal shield decorations, as well as four spherical lamps hanging from the marquee. Above the marquee are arches topped by bracket-shaped keystones. A transom bar runs horizontally above the keystones, above which are slightly recessed pairs of windows, flanked by bellflowers.

The outer bays contain aluminum double doors, with display boxes on either side of and above the doors. The doorways contain eared architraves and are topped by cornices. Above the cornices are round-arched panels, with keystones flanked by laurel leaves. The outer bays contain carved panels, rather than windows, on the upper story. The northwest and northeast corners of the theater's facade are curved. Each end of the north elevation contains a Corinthian pilaster, and the northern ends of the west and east elevations also contain a pilaster. An entablature runs above the upper story of the facade, wrapping around the curved corners to the northwest and northeast. Atop the central columns, the entablature has an inscription with the theater's name. A neon sign with the "Cort" name had been installed in front of the frieze in 1937; it was removed during the 2021 renovation. Above the entablature is a parapet with modillions and a blind balustrade.

Annex 

A recessed brown-granite bay at the end of the alley connects the annex and original theater. The annex's elevator shaft is about 30 feet above the roof of the original theater. Unlike the original facade, it has a modern design with cream-colored terracotta facade panels interspersed with polished brownstone pieces. There are glass display boxes at ground level, as well as a glazed window at the eastern corner of the annex's upper stories. There is also an LED sign on the exterior of the annex's upper stories.

Interior 
The Jones's interior design is credited to Arthur Brunet, according to a promotional booklet from the theater's opening. While the interior was not similar to that of the Petit Trianon, the design features are from the same era, the 17th century. The interior color scheme was described in the booklet as having "a blending of old rose and gold" and plaster decoration "in  colors of champagne and sienna".

Lobby
The entrance lobby is a rectangular space accessed from 48th Street. The lobby is laid in white Pavanozza marble with plasterwork panels. Tiffany Studios was credited with the design of the lobby. The walls of the lobby contain a dado of Pavanozza marble, which surrounds the entire room. The north doors lead to the street, while three doors on the south wall connect to the auditorium. The south doors are surrounded by plaster frames, above which are entablatures and pediments with cartouches. There is a niche on the east wall, which contains a pedestal with a bust of Marie Antoinette. The west wall has box-office windows with marble frames. The box office's metalwork originally was made of bronze with gold and enamel reliefs. The lobby has a coved ceiling with raised-plaster motifs and a central medallion with a chandelier made of bronze and crystal. There is no accessible restroom in the original lobby.

Auditorium

The auditorium has an orchestra level, two balconies, boxes, and a stage behind the proscenium arch. The auditorium is square in layout and is designed with plaster decorations in high relief. The Jones's operator The Shubert Organization cites the auditorium as having 1,092 seats; meanwhile, The Broadway League cites a figure of 1,084 seats and Playbill gives a figure of 1,049. These are divided into 502 seats in the orchestra, 264 on the first balcony, and 263 on the second balcony, as well as 24 box seats and 19 standing-only spots. The Cort was originally a 999-seat venue when it opened in 1912.

Seating areas
The rear (north) end of the orchestra contains a promenade, which has doorways with eared architraves on the rear wall, as well as plain doorways on the side walls. The orchestra has a raked floor and wainscoted walls, with paneling above the wainscoting. Staircases with iron railings lead from the orchestra to the balconies. The orchestra level is wheelchair-accessible via the main doors, but the balcony levels could only be accessed by steps prior to the annex's construction. The rears of the balconies have promenades with standing rails. The balcony levels have doorways with eared architraves on the side walls. The second balcony's walls are topped by friezes with swags and cameo panels. The balconies have floral moldings on the fronts of their undersides, with crystal light fixtures underneath. Air conditioning grilles are placed below the balconies.

On either side of the stage is a wall section with two boxes each at the first and second balcony level. Each wall section is flanked by Adam-style panels. The boxes themselves are curved and contain latticework and cameo decorations on the front railings. Under each box is a molding and a medallion holding a chandelier. Above each pair of second-balcony boxes, there is an eared architrave, as well as a latticework panel that depicts female figures flanking swags and a cartouche. Originally, the auditorium had twelve boxes (four on each level), but the boxes at orchestra level were removed. Instead of an orchestra pit, there was a Wurlitzer organ that a single musician could operate. The organ was an Opus 20 model with 13 manuals and three ranks.

Other design features
It consists of latticed plasterwork with art glass beneath it. The art glass was capable of illumination, but the illumination was then turned off until the theater was renovated in 2021. The sides of the arch have swags and medallions. Above the center of the arch, and within the spandrels, there are depictions of putti and muses entangled in vines. There is a cornice with modillions and dentils above the arch. The sounding board curves onto the ceiling above the proscenium arch and is divided into three sections. The sounding board depicts a minuet that, according to the New-York Tribune, had been made "during the period made famous in Antoine Watteau's drawings of French court life at Versailles".

The ceiling is divided into three rectangular sections, which are recessed coves. The ribs of the ceiling, which separate the coves, are decorated with swags and wreaths. The center section contains a circular dome, which has a frieze extending outward, as well as an overhanging bronze and crystal chandelier at the center. Three additional panels, similar in design, hang over the second balcony.

Annex 
The annex has accessible bathrooms, concession areas, lounge, dressing rooms, and rehearsal space. A grand staircase connects the lounges on three stories of the annex, with views of 48th Street. An elevator is being placed in the annex to allow wheelchair access into the auditorium's balconies. The annex is connected to the existing theater via new door openings. With the construction of the annex, the stage-left wing was also expanded into the annex.

History
Times Square became the epicenter for large-scale theater productions between 1900 and the Great Depression. Manhattan's theater district had begun to shift from Union Square and Madison Square during the first decade of the 20th century. From 1901 to 1920, forty-three theaters were built around Broadway in Midtown Manhattan, including the Cort Theatre. John Cort was a theatrical operator who had become highly successful on the West Coast of the United States, with 150 theaters at his peak, and came to New York City in 1905. Cort had, in 1910, become president of the National Theatre Owners' Association, a group of circuits that tried to break away from the New York-based syndicates like the Klaw and Erlanger circuit. It was in this capacity that Cort decided to build new theaters in New York City.

Cort operation

Development and early years 

Edward B. Corey acquired the lots on 138–146 West 48th Street and leased them to Cort for 21 years starting in January 1912. Thomas Lamb was hired to design a theater there. That March, Cort announced that he would erect two theaters in New York City: the Cort Theatre on 48th Street and the Illington Theatre on 46th Street. The design of the Cort was so important that the specifications for the theater's design were encoded in the lease agreement. Namely, the design features could not be "inferior" to those in the now-demolished Playhouse Theatre across the street. By that June, the production Peg o' My Heart featuring Laurette Taylor had been scheduled for the Cort. The opening of the theater was originally scheduled for November 1912.

The Cort opened on December 20, 1912, with Peg o' My Heart. Theatrical critics of the time considered the Cort to be physically on the "wrong side" of Broadway; whereas most contemporary theaters were west of that street, the Cort was to the east. Nonetheless, the theater was described in a contemporary media source as "one of the most exquisitely beautiful playhouses in Manhattan". Theatre magazine wrote of the Cort's "sweeping, commanding lines, comfortable seats and admirable acoustic properties. If any exception is to be taken, it is that pink is too delicate a shade for such an expanse of decoration."

Peg o' My Heart had over 600 performances, a major accomplishment for the time, when 100 performances constituted a hit. In 1913, Cort gave Oliver Morosco the exclusive rights to show plays at his namesake theater for five years. After Peg o' My Heart ended, the Mutual Film Corporation temporarily used the Cort as a cinema in mid-1914. The venue then hosted two hit productions: Under Cover, which opened in 1914, and The Princess Pat, which opened in 1915. Due to the large number of early hits at the Cort, it was quickly perceived among the theatrical community as a "lucky" venue.

Late 1910s and early 1920s 

The theater presented John Cort's productions, as well as those of other producers such as Morosco, the Shubert family, the Selwyn family, and Arthur Hammerstein, in its early years. Molly O and Upstairs and Down, as well as the hit The Yellow Jacket, performed at the Cort during 1916. The following year, the venue hosted Mother Carey's Chickens and Flo-Flo, the latter of which had 220 performances. The Cort then hosted several of Shakespeare's plays in early 1918. The theater's final hit of the 1910s was Abraham Lincoln, which opened in 1919. The Cort continued to host hits through the following decade. These included Jim Jam Jems (1920), with Joe E. Brown; Captain Applejack (1921); Merton of the Movies (1922); and The Swan (1923), with Basil Rathbone and Eva Le Gallienne. Other events of the early 1920s included a seance performed by John Armstrong Chaloner in 1921, as well as benefit performances such as Mu Lan (1921) and Book of Job (1922).

The theater had a series of short-lived productions in 1924. More successful was the play The Second Mrs. Tanqueray (1924), with Ethel Barrymore and Henry Daniell, and the comedy White Collars (1925). These were followed by another set of productions with short runs. A dispute arose in October 1925 when three producers sued each other, alleging that Cort had granted each of them the right to use the theater during the same time period. Judge Thomas D. Thacher, of the United States District Court for the Southern District of New York, issued two injunctions: one granting production rights to Jane, Our Stranger, and another that canceled that production after four performances. Other hits of the mid-1920s included The Jazz Singer, which was transferred to the Cort in late 1925, as well as The Little Spitfire, which opened in 1926. The 1926 play Beyond Evil, which discussed interracial marriage, nearly prompted a riot when it was performed at the Cort.

Shubert operation

1920s to 1960s 

In May 1927, the Shubert Organization purchased the theater from Edward B. Corey, subject to a mortgage of $210,000. The Shuberts took over the operation from Cort, who retired afterward. Joseph Leblang and his representatives then operated the venue from August 1928 to December 1932. The 1928 drama These Days, which had eight performances at the Cort, was Katharine Hepburn's first Broadway appearance. Subsequently, the theater hosted A Most Immoral Lady in 1928 with Alice Brady, as well as Your Uncle Dudley in 1929 with Walter Connolly. The Cort hosted Jed Harris's revival of the play Uncle Vanya in 1930, along with the hit production Five Star Final the same year.  In addition to theatrical performances, the Cort hosted events like an opera in 1927 and a folk-song recital in 1930.

Richard Aldrich and Alfred De Liagre made their production debut in 1933 with Three-Cornered Moon. Two hits followed: The Green Bay Tree in 1933 and The Bishop Misbehaves in 1935. Two plays by George Abbott took up the Cort during most of the next three years: Boy Meets Girl (1935) and Room Service (1937), both of which had hundreds of performances. Several major productions followed, including The White Steed (1939), The Male Animal (1940), Charley's Aunt (1940), Cafe Crown (1942), The Eve of St. Mark (1942), and A Bell for Adano (1944). During 1946, the Theatre Guild's Shakespearean Repertory Company appeared in The Winter's Tale; Katharine Cornell produced and starred in Antigone and Candida; and Estelle Winwood and Cornelia Otis Skinner starred in Lady Windermere's Fan. This was followed in 1948 by the hits The Respectful Prostitute and Two Blind Mice. The 1949 production of The Father featured Grace Kelly's Broadway debut.

Even in the 1950s, the Cort  continued to present long-running productions. The Theatre Guild returned in 1950, presenting As You Like It. This was followed by several hits such as Saint Joan (1951), The Shrike (1952), The Fifth Season (1953), and The Rainmaker (1954). Another major production was  The Diary of Anne Frank, which opened in 1955 and played the Cort for over a year before relocating. Another major productions of the late 1950s was The Rope Dancers in 1957. The play Sunrise at Campobello opened in 1958 with Henry Jones, Mary Fickett, and Anne Seymour, as well as James Earl Jones in his Broadway debut; it had well over 500 performances.

The Cort hosted several productions in the early 1960s, including The Hostage and Advise and Consent in 1960, as well as Purlie Victorious and Sunday in New York in 1961. For the rest of the decade, the Cort had many productions, few of which were hits. In May 1962, the Royal Dramatic Theatre of Sweden had a brief engagement with The Father, Long Day's Journey into Night, and Miss Julie in repertory. The next year saw a relatively unsuccessful adaptation of One Flew Over the Cuckoo's Nest; this was followed in 1965 by The Zulu and the Zayda.

1970s to 1990s 

CBS leased the theater as a television studio for The Merv Griffin Show, which started broadcasting there in August 1969. The network spent $1 million on renovating the theater to convert it to a television studio. By late 1970, Merv Griffin had moved his show to California. Griffin said he had been "ashamed" of leaving the Cort, since CBS had renovated it exclusively for his show, but the ratings for The Merv Griffin Show had increased following its relocation to California. Meanwhile, CBS continued to lease the theater at a high price. Two years into CBS's lease, the construction of the neighboring 1211 Avenue of the Americas caused structural damage to the theater's interior, and two girders were placed on the eastern wall. Because the interior was no longer suitable for television productions, CBS decided to let the lease lapse. The CBS lease from 1969 to 1972 was the only period in which the Cort was used as a television studio rather than as a theater.

The theater hosted the short-lived All the Girls Came Out to Play in 1972 and Jockey Club Stakes in 1973. The Magic Show opened in 1974 and played 1,920 performances over the next five years. The last production of that decade was King Richard III, which opened in 1979 and ran only 33 performances. In 1980, the Cort hosted the flop Clothes for a Summer Hotel, as well as the more successful Home the same year, with over 200 performances. The Cort then hosted Rose in 1981; Medea and Twice Around the Park in 1982; and A Moon for the Misbegotten and Ma Rainey's Black Bottom in 1984. Theatrical historian Ken Bloom, observing several of the Cort's short performances, said: "The Cort's luck seems to have run out." The 1980s ended with the South African play Sarafina!, which played for over a year. During the 1980s, the Shuberts renovated the Cort as part of a restoration program for their Broadway theaters.

The New York City Landmarks Preservation Commission (LPC) had started considering protecting the Cort as an official city landmark in 1982, with discussions continuing over the next several years. The LPC designated both the facade and the interior as landmarks on November 17, 1987. This was part of the LPC's wide-ranging effort in 1987 to grant landmark status to Broadway theaters. The New York City Board of Estimate ratified the designations in March 1988. The Shuberts, the Nederlanders, and Jujamcyn collectively sued the LPC in June 1988 to overturn the landmark designations of 22 theaters, including the Cort, on the merit that the designations severely limited the extent to which the theaters could be modified. The lawsuit was escalated to the New York Supreme Court and the Supreme Court of the United States, but these designations were ultimately upheld in 1992.

The Cort hosted the hit The Grapes of Wrath in 1990, as well as Lincoln Center Theater's short-lived production of Two Shakespearean Actors in 1992. This was followed in 1994 by Twilight: Los Angeles, 1992. Lincoln Center Theater returned to the Cort in 1995 with its revival of The Heiress, which ran for over 300 performances. Lincoln Center Theater then booked two additional productions: Sex and Longing in 1996 and An American Daughter in 1997. At the end of the decade, productions at the Cort included Freak (1998), The Blue Room (1998), and Kat and the Kings (1999).

2000s and 2010s 

In 2000, the Cort hosted a short production of The Green Bird. It then hosted Hollywood Arms in 2002, A Year with Frog and Toad in 2003, and Laugh Whore in 2004. As part of a settlement with the United States Department of Justice in 2003, the Shuberts agreed to improve disabled access at their 16 landmarked Broadway theaters, including the Cort. The theater's other productions in the decade included On Golden Pond (2005), Barefoot in the Park and The Little Dog Laughed (2006), Radio Golf  and The Homecoming (2007), The 39 Steps (2008), and You're Welcome America: A Final Night with George W. Bush (2009).

Early in the 2010s, the theater hosted Fences and Time Stands Still in 2010; Born Yesterday and Stick Fly in 2011; and The Lyons and Grace in 2012. Fences set the box office record for the theater, grossing $1,175,626 over eight performances for the week ending July 11, 2010. The Cort hosted Breakfast at Tiffany's in 2013, and No Man's Land and Waiting for Godot played in repertory the same year. Subsequently, The Cripple of Inishmaan and This is Our Youth played at the Cort in 2014, while Fish in the Dark and Sylvia played in 2015. The Shuberts acquired an adjacent garage to the west and demolished it in 2016. The Cort then hosted the production of Bright Star that year. In 2017, the Shuberts received permission from the LPC to construct a 35-foot-wide annex west of the existing theater, designed by Kostow Greenwood Architects. Francesca Russo would also design a renovation of the existing theater. The Shuberts also received permission to transfer  of air development rights to a 49-story hotel adjoining the theater; the air rights sale was valued at $50 million. The Cort additionally showed two productions in 2017: Indecent and M. Butterfly. Mike Birbiglia performed his one-man comedy The New One in 2018, and the productions of King Lear and Derren Brown's one-man show Secret were housed at the Cort in 2019.

2020s to present 
The theater closed on March 12, 2020, due to the COVID-19 pandemic. During the shutdown, in March 2021, the Shuberts announced that the Cort would be refurbished and the annex would be built. JRM Construction was hired as the general contractor for the project. The Minutes, which had only played previews at the Cort before the shutdown, relocated as a result of the renovation. During the COVID-19 shutdown, the Shuberts, Nederlanders, and Jujamcyn had pledged to increase racial and cultural diversity in their theaters, including naming at least one theater for a Black theatrical personality. Accordingly, in March 2022, the Shuberts announced that the Cort would be renamed after actor James Earl Jones and would be rededicated upon its reopening in mid-2022. The Jones was the second Broadway theater to be named after a Black theatrical personality. 

In August 2022, it was announced that the Jones would reopen that November with previews of the play Ohio State Murders. The James Earl Jones Theatre's marquee was revealed on September 12, 2022, celebrating the completion of the theater's $47 million renovation and expansion. Ohio State Murders officially opened in December 2022 as the renamed theater's first show, running for one month. This is scheduled to be followed in April 2023 by Room.

Notable productions 
Productions are listed by the year of their first performance.

1910s to 1990s

 1915: The Princess Pat
 1918: Everyman
 1918: The Merchant of Venice
 1918: As You Like It
 1918: Julius Caesar
 1918: The Better 'Ole
 1919: Abraham Lincoln
 1921: Captain Applejack
 1922: Merton of the Movies
 1924: The Assumption of Hannele
 1924: The Second Mrs. Tanqueray
 1925: The Jazz Singer
 1928: The Wrecker
 1930: Uncle Vanya
 1930: Five Star Final
 1932: The Blue Bird
 1933: The Green Bay Tree
 1935: The Bishop Misbehaves
 1935: Most of the Game
 1935: There's Wisdom in Women
 1937: Room Service
 1939: The White Steed
 1940: The Male Animal
 1940: Charley's Aunt
 1942: Cafe Crown
 1942: I Killed the Count
 1946: The Winter's Tale
 1946: Antigone
 1946: Candida
 1946: Lady Windermere's Fan
 1948: Ghosts
 1948: Hedda Gabler
 1948: The Happy Journey to Trenton and Camden and The Respectful Prostitute
 1948: Make Way for Lucia
 1949: Two Blind Mice
 1949: The Father
 1950: As You Like It
 1951: Saint Joan
 1952: The Shrike
 1954: The Rainmaker
 1955: The Diary of Anne Frank
 1958: Sunrise at Campobello
 1960: Once Upon a Mattress
 1960: The Hostage
 1960: Advise and Consent
 1961: Purlie Victorious
 1961: Sunday in New York
 1962: The Father, Long Day's Journey into Night, and Miss Julie
 1963: One Flew Over the Cuckoo's Nest
 1965: Boeing-Boeing
 1965: The Zulu and the Zayda
 1967: Johnny No-Trump
 1967: Something Different
 1968: Leda Had a Little Swan
 1969: Red, White and Maddox
 1974: The Magic Show
 1979: King Richard III
 1980: Clothes for a Summer Hotel
 1982: Medea
 1984: A Moon for the Misbegotten
 1984: Ma Rainey's Black Bottom
 1988: Sarafina!
 1990: The Grapes of Wrath
 1993: Face Value
 1994: Twilight: Los Angeles, 1992
 1995: The Heiress
 1997: An American Daughter
 1998: Freak
 1998: The Blue Room
 1999: Kat and the Kings

2000s to present

 2000: The Green Bird
 2002: Hollywood Arms
 2003: A Year with Frog and Toad
 2003: Bobbi Boland
 2004: Laugh Whore
 2005: On Golden Pond
 2006: Barefoot in the Park
 2006: The Little Dog Laughed
 2007: Radio Golf
 2007: The Homecoming
 2008: The 39 Steps
 2009: You're Welcome America: A Final Night with George W. Bush
 2010: A View from the Bridge
 2010: Fences
 2010: Time Stands Still
 2011: Born Yesterday
 2011: Stick Fly
 2012: The Lyons
 2012: Grace
 2013: Breakfast at Tiffany's
 2013: No Man's Land and Waiting for Godot
 2014: The Cripple of Inishmaan
 2014: This is Our Youth
 2015: Fish in the Dark
 2015: Sylvia
 2016: Bright Star
 2017: Indecent
 2017: M. Butterfly
 2018: Mike Birbiglia's The New One
 2019: King Lear
 2019: Derren Brown: Secret
 2020: The Minutes
 2022: Ohio State Murders
 2023: Room

See also 

 List of New York City Designated Landmarks in Manhattan from 14th to 59th Streets
 List of Broadway theaters

References

Notes

Citations

Sources

External links 

 
 

1912 establishments in New York (state)
Broadway theatres
Neoclassical architecture in New York City
New York City Designated Landmarks in Manhattan
New York City interior landmarks
Shubert Organization
Theater District, Manhattan
Theatres completed in 1912
Thomas W. Lamb buildings